Durrell Richardson (born July 7, 1979) is an American former professional boxer who competed from 2004 to 2012.

Amateur career
Durrell had a stellar amateur career, finishing with a 46–4 record. He won the 2002 National Golden Gloves welterweight championship.

Professional career
On May 1, 2008 Richardson lost to Jesús González and the vacant WBC Continental Americas Light Middleweight title. His only other loss at the time was to undefeated contender Deandre Latimore. Richardson is the older cousin of the American actor Brandon Richardson.

References

External links

Light-middleweight boxers
1979 births
Living people
American male boxers
Boxers from Ohio